The Long and Short of It are an Australian duo consisting of David Baird and Patsy Toop (OAM), who met in 2007 and released their first music in 2009.

The duo have released six albums, two EPs, and have won awards including a Tamworth Songwriters Award (2011), a Tasmanian Independent Country Music Award for Most Popular Duo (2016), an Indie Country Music Australia (ICMA) Award for Most Popular Independent Country Duo (2017, 2019 and 2021), a Southern Star Awards Award for Best Duo or Band (2016) and a Gold Media Medallion Award for Best Duo Nationally (2015 & 2018).

Discography

Albums

EPs

References

Musical groups from Melbourne
2007 establishments in Australia
Musical groups established in 2007
Australian country music groups